Folgoso do Courel is a town and municipality in Lugo in Galicia province in north-west Spain. As of 2004 it has 1397 inhabitants.

It is one of the main villages in O Courel, a geohistorical land in Lugo.

Municipalities in the Province of Lugo